Flygbussarna provide an airport bus service between many airports in and cities in Sweden. They are operated by FAC Flygbussarna Airport Coaches AB.

Airports and cities served
FAC Flygbussarna Airport Coaches provides bus transfer to and from eight airports and two harbours in Sweden. However, unlike many coach companies in Europe, none of the fleet is wheelchair accessible, except in Gothenburg.

Airports:
Stockholm-Arlanda Airport – Stockholm
Stockholm-Bromma Airport – Stockholm
Stockholm-Skavsta Airport – Stockholm
Stockholm-Skavsta Airport – Linköping – Norrköping
Stockholm-Västerås Airport – Stockholm
Göteborg Landvetter Airport – Gothenburg
Malmö Airport – Malmö/Lund
Visby Airport – Visby (in the summer time)

Harbours:
Stockholm – Nynäshamn harbour, Destination Gotland´s ferries
Stockholm – Stadsgården, Viking Line´s ferries
Stockholm – Värtahamnen, Tallink Silja Line's ferries

Advertising
In 2009 Acne, a Swedish advertising company, built a coach bus using 50 wrecked cars. The construction resembling a real Flygbussarna coach bus was meant to encourage drivers to take the bus instead of driving their own cars, which would lead to less CO2 emissions.

Acquisition
The Norwegian bus company Vy has announced that it acquired Flygbussarna which is planned to be completed in the first quarter of 2020.

References

External links
Official website

Bus companies of Sweden
Airport bus services
Companies based in Stockholm